Alan Walker (born 7 July 1962 in Emley, Yorkshire) is a former English cricketer. Walker was a left-handed batsman who bowled right-arm fast-medium. His primary role was as a bowler.

External links
Alan Walker at Cricinfo
Alan Walker at CricketArchive
Matches and detailed statistics for Alan Walker

1962 births
Living people
People from Kirklees (district)
English cricketers
Northamptonshire cricketers
Marylebone Cricket Club cricketers
Durham cricketers
Cricketers from Yorkshire